The Ruwenzori thicket rat (Grammomys ibeanus) is a species of rodent in the family Muridae.
It is found in Kenya, Malawi, South Sudan, Tanzania, Uganda, and Zambia.
Its natural habitats are subtropical or tropical moist montane forests and subtropical or tropical high-altitude shrubland.
It is threatened by habitat loss.

References
 Dieterlen, F., Taylor, P. & Boitani, L. 2004.  Grammomys ibeanus.   2006 IUCN Red List of Threatened Species.   Downloaded on 19 July 2007.

Grammomys
Rodents of Africa
Mammals described in 1910
Taxonomy articles created by Polbot